Joanot Martorell (c. 1410 – 1465) was a Valencian knight and writer, best known for authoring the novel Tirant lo Blanch, written in Valencian and published at Valencia in 1490. This novel is often regarded as one of the peaks of the literature in Catalan language and it played a major role in influencing later writers such as Miguel de Cervantes, who, in the book burning scene of Don Quixote, says "I swear to you, my friend, this (Tirant lo Blanch) is the best book of its kind in the world". The novel deals with the adventures of a knight in the Byzantine Empire; it is considered one of the first works of alternate history.

Martorell apparently was a chivalrous man and suffered an early death due to court intrigue, leaving the novel unfinished. It was prepared for publication by his friend and colleague, Martí Joan de Galba.

See also
 Route of the Valencian classics

Notes and references

External links

 Tirant lo Blanch website by the Institut Lluis Vives
 Joanot Martorell by the Association of Catalan Language Writers. Website in Catalan, English and Spanish.
 Tirant lo Blanch, by Joanot Martorell in LletrA, Catalan Literature Online (Open University of Catalonia)] 
 
 

1413 births
1468 deaths
People from Valencia
Writers from the Valencian Community
Medieval Catalan-language writers
15th-century Spanish writers
Medieval knights